Cerium(III) acetylacetonate is a compound with formula Ce(C5H7O2)3(H2O)x. It is typically isolated as the trihydrate. Partial dehydration gives the dihydrate, a  red-brown solid.

Reactions
Cerium acetylacetonate is a precursor to mesoporous nanocrystalline ceria using the sol-gel process. It can also be used along with gadolinium acetylacetonate to synthesize gadolinia-doped ceria (GDC) gel powders.

See also
Cerium(IV) tetrakis(acetylacetonate)

References

Cerium(III) compounds
Acetylacetonate complexes